Sar Teyuk (also Romanized as Sar Teyūk and Sarteyūk ; also known as Sar-i-Tīūk, Sarīūk, Sar Teyūk, and Sar Teyūk) is a village in Howmeh Rural District, in the Central District of Haftgel County, Khuzestan Province, Iran. At the 2006 census, its population was 50, in 12 families.

References 

Populated places in Haftkel County